Pic de Sotllo is a mountain of the Montcalm Massif.

It shares the name of three nearby ponds (Estanyets de Sotllo).

See also
List of Pyrenean three-thousanders
List of mountains in Catalonia

References

Mountains of Catalonia
Mountains of the Pyrenees